Set This Circus Down is the sixth studio album by American country music singer Tim McGraw. It was released in April 2001 via Curb Records. The album produced four singles, all of which reached number one on the US Billboard Hot Country Songs chart.

Content
The first single from his album is "Grown Men Don't Cry" released in March 2001 and was written by Tom Douglas and Steve Seskin. "Angry All the Time", the second single, was originally recorded by its writer, Bruce Robison, on his 1996 self-titled album. "The Cowboy in Me" is the third single, and it reached Number One one week after McGraw's duet with Jo Dee Messina, "Bring On the Rain". "Unbroken" became the album's final single in May 2002. "Things Change" is a studio recording of a song which McGraw had previously recorded as a live version, which reached #34 on the country charts in 2000 from unsolicited airplay. Another track from this album is "Telluride". Despite reaching #52, it wasn't officially released as a single. It also appears on Josh Gracin's 2008 album We Weren't Crazy, from which it was released as a single in December 2008. "Angel Boy" was made into a music video, which got some airplay on CMT, but was not released as a single either.

Reception

Commercial performance
The album reached Number One on the Top Country Albums chart. It additionally peaked at No.2 on the Billboard 200 while breaking the Top 20 in Canada and peaking at No.95 in Australia. The album has since been certified 3× Multi-Platinum by the RIAA for shipments of three million copies in the United States, as well as single platinum for sales in Canada.

Critical response
About.com gave a "favorable" review and said it would not "disappoint those used to the excellent song selection of Tim's previous releases." Thom Jurek from Allmusic gave it 4 out of 5 stars and noted that Tim "masterfully and consistently flows from one sound style to the next[, yet] his familiar country-pop sound remains evident throughout, especially on the title track, a song about a fast-paced couple yearning to kick back and relax in the country (no one said the themes would be original)." While Billboard magazine, and Rolling Stone all gave it positive and favorable reviews, David Brown from Entertainment Weekly gave it a B grade and said "From the eclectic songs he and his coproducers have chosen to the simple fact that his face doesn't appear on the cover for the first time, Set This Circus Down presents itself as an Important Statement, McGraw's career defining work[, though] McGraw doesn't write any of his material" when saying that the album "feels conceptual, almost autobiographical." John "weathered old reviewer" Hanson from Sputnikmusic gave it a 2.5 average after saying "Set This Circus Down, in [his] eyes his best album, shows the time where he was at both the least level of cheese, but had not yet 'sold out,' or sold out as much as you can in the Country scene."

Track listing

Personnel

Musicians
 Tim McGraw – lead vocals 
 Steve Nathan – keyboards (1, 3-14)
 Jeff Babko – keyboards (2)
 Biff Watson – acoustic guitar (1, 3, 4, 5, 7-14)
 Larry Byrom – acoustic guitar (6)
 Michael Landau – electric guitar (1, 3-14)
 B. James Lowry – electric guitar (1, 3-14)
 Brent Mason – electric guitar (2)
 Val McCallum – electric guitar (2)
 Byron Gallimore – baritone guitar (7, 11)
 Mike Henderson – baritone guitar solo (11)
 Paul Franklin – steel guitar
 Glenn Worf – bass (1, 3-11, 13, 14)
 Mike Elizondo – bass (2, 12)
 Lonnie Wilson – drums (1, 3-11, 13, 14)
 Peter M. Thomas  – drums (2, 12)
 Aubrey Haynie – fiddle
 Rob Mathes – string arrangements and conductor (3, 13, 14)
 Michael Omartian – string arrangements and conductor (8)
 Carl Gorodetzky – string contractor (3, 8, 13, 14)
 The Nashville String Machine – strings (3, 8, 13, 14)
 Gene Miller – backing vocals (1-9, 11-14)
 Chris Rodriguez – backing vocals (1, 3-7, 9, 11-14)
 Curtis Wright – backing vocals (2, 8)
 Curtis Young – backing vocals (8)
 Faith Hill – backing vocals (11)

Production
 Byron Gallimore – producer 
 Tim McGraw – producer, concept, direction
 James Stroud – producer 
 Julian King – tracking engineer (1, 3-11, 13, 14), string engineer (8), additional engineer
 John Paterno – tracking engineer (2, 12), additional engineer
 Russ Martin – string engineer (3, 13, 14)
 Ricky Cobble – second tracking engineer (1, 3, 4, 5, 7-11, 13, 14), assistant string engineer (8), additional engineer
 Samie Barela – second tracking engineer (2, 12)
 Jed Hackett – second tracking engineer (6), additional engineer
 Greg Fogie – assistant second tracking engineer (1, 3, 4, 7, 9, 14)
 David Bryant – assistant string engineer (3, 13, 14), assistant second tracking engineer (5, 8, 10, 11, 13)
 Clinton Brown – additional engineer
 Dennis Davis – additional engineer
 Randy LeRoy – additional engineer
 Erik Lutkins – additional engineer
 Jonathan Merritt – additional engineer
 Ronnie Rivera – additional engineer
 Mike Shipley – mixing 
 Jeff Burns – mix assistant 
 Robert Hadley – mastering 
 Doug Sax – mastering 
 Ann Callis – production assistant
 Eric Gallimore – song assistant 
 Missi Gallimore – song assistant 
 Michelle Metzger – song assistant 
 Tiffany Swinea – song assistant 
 Kelly Clauge Wright – creative director 
 Glenn Sweitzer – art direction, design, digital Illustration 
 Greg Call – cover Illustration 
 Marina Chavez – road photography 
 Steven Klein – studio photography

Studios
 Tracks 1, 3-11, 13 & 14 tracked at Ocean Way Nashville (Nashville, Tennessee)
 Tracks 2 & 12 tracked at Sony Music Studios (Santa Monica, California)
 Strings on Tracks 3, 13 & 14 recorded at Ocean Way Recording; Track 8 recorded at The Tracking Room (Nashville, Tennessee)
 Additional recording at Essential Sound and Final Stage Mastering (Nashville, Tennessee); The Sound Kitchen (Franklin, Tennessee); Extasy Recording South (Los Angeles, California)
 Mixed at Record One (Sherman Oaks, California)
 Mastered at The Mastering Lab (Hollywood, California)

Charts and certifications

Weekly charts

Year-end charts

Singles
All singles reached Number One on the Billboard Hot Country Songs chart and all reached top 40 on the Hot 100 chart.

Certifications

References

2001 albums
Albums produced by Byron Gallimore
Tim McGraw albums
Curb Records albums
Albums produced by Tim McGraw